"Magic to Do" is the opening song from the musical Pippin. It was introduced by Ben Vereen in the Broadway production and performed by Northern Calloway in London. The entire song runs around four minutes.

The song is sung by the Leading Player and the in-show theatre troupe, who invites the audience to watch a show about a Pippin, a prince living in Charlemagne's France who is searching for fulfilment and does not know where to go in life. At the start of the song, only the Leading Player sings. Fastrada and the Chorus come in at the end.

Near the end of the song the characters go out into the audience and thank them for coming to the show.

In some newer versions of the play, an extended, darker ending concludes the play with an instrumental reprise of "Magic to Do," ominously stressing the cyclical themes of the show.

References 
 Pippin at Music Theatre International

Songs written by Stephen Schwartz (composer)
Year of song missing